Chapter 2 is the second album of South Korean pop music group g.o.d. It was much better received than their debut album, as evidenced by sales figures, and several songs in the album won the #1 ranking on various music programs and multiple awards.

Reception
The album contains several of g.o.d's most famous songs. Danny Ahn has credited the album, particularly its title track, with propelling the group to mainstream success, especially after their debut performance and album earlier that year had met with lukewarm critical reception. Producer Park Jin-young has stated that the group had prepared this album under much pressure and may have disbanded for good had it not succeeded. Although the album debuted at only #10 in the RIAK monthly chart, it would go on to sell over 500,000 copies.

"Love and Remember" won the #1 ranking on both SBS's Inkigayo and KBS's Music Bank, earning the group their first ever win on a music program. "Sorrow" (애수) and "Friday Night" both won "Triple Crowns" (#1 spot for three consecutive weeks) on Inkigayo and also won #1 at least once on Music Bank.

In popular culture
"Love and Remember" was used as the background music in the Drama Special episode "Pitch-black Darkness", which starred g.o.d member Danny Ahn and in the tvN television series Reply 1994. It was also chosen as the encore song sung by all performers at the 2017 KBS Song Festival.

Accolades

Track listing
All lyrics and music is written and composed by Park Jin-young, except where noted.

Charts and sales

Monthly charts

Year-end charts

Sales

References

External links
Album Information – Mnet 
god - Love and remember, 지오디 - 사랑해 그리고 기억해, Music Camp 20000122 — MBCKpop YouTube
god - Sorrow, 지오디 - 애수, Music Camp 20000226 – MBCKpop YouTube

1999 albums
G.o.d albums
Korean-language albums